Koontz House may refer to:

Kinter K. Koontz House, Phoenix, Arizona
Koontz House, Natchez, Mississippi, listed on the NRHP and more commonly known as Green Leaves
James H. and Cynthia Koontz House, Echo, Oregon, listed on the NRHP and also known as Koontz House

See also 
J. H. Koontz Building, Echo, Oregon, listed on the National Register of Historic Places listings in Umatilla County, Oregon